Seguimos Bailando is the third album by Venezuelan group Calle Ciega, released in 2001.

Track listing
 "Yo Tenia Una Luz"
 "Parranda en la Calle Ciega"
 "Solo Te Quiero Amar"
 "Between You and I"
 "El Marcianito"
 "La Pantallera"
 "Si Tu No Estas"
 "Imaginate"
 "Pomposo"
 "Con la Punta el Pie"
 "Que Sigan Bailando"
 "Amparito"

2001 albums
Calle Ciega albums